The Federal Correctional Institution, Loretto (FCI Loretto) is a low-security United States federal prison for male inmates in Pennsylvania. An adjacent satellite prison camp houses minimum-security male offenders. It is operated by the Federal Bureau of Prisons, a division of the United States Department of Justice.

, most prisoners have sentences related to illegal drugs. As of that year, the average sentence length is 12 years, and some prisoners have life sentences.

History
FCI Loretto was constructed in 1985 on land which was occupied by St. Francis Seminary from the late 1950s to 1979. Fifteen inmates from the federal prison camp at Allenwood, Pennsylvania, assisted in the construction. These inmates included a US Representative involved in the ABSCAM scandal.

By December 2020, nearly 75% of the 856 inmates there were diagnosed with COVID-19. Several inmate family members filed lawsuits in response to reports of substandard living conditions during the pandemic and lack of speed in testing and isolating COVID-19 positive inmates.

Notable incidents
In December 2012, the New York Post and several other media sources reported that Cameron Douglas, the son of film actor Michael Douglas, had suffered a broken leg after being assaulted at the prison. Cameron Douglas was serving a 9-year sentence for drug trafficking, and was located in the Central One Unit. It was reported that an unnamed high-ranking Mafia figure had placed a $100 bounty on him for agreeing to testify against his suppliers, brothers David and Eduardo Escalera. Douglas was later transferred to the Federal Correctional Institution, Cumberland, a medium-security facility in Maryland.

Facility
FCI Loretto has minimal educational opportunities and a drug-abuse treatment program.

Its programs include English as a second language (ESL) and General Education Development (GED) classes. As of 2016, 125 prisoners are in the ESL and/or GED programs.

Notable inmates (current)

Notable inmates (former)

See also

List of U.S. federal prisons
Federal Bureau of Prisons
Incarceration in the United States

References

External links
Bop.gov

Buildings and structures in Cambria County, Pennsylvania
Loreto
Prisons in Pennsylvania
1985 establishments in Pennsylvania